The following is a partial list of the "G" codes for Medical Subject Headings (MeSH), as defined by the United States National Library of Medicine (NLM).

This list continues the information at List of MeSH codes (G11). Codes following these are found at List of MeSH codes (G13). For other MeSH codes, see List of MeSH codes.

The source for this content is the set of 2006 MeSH Trees from the NLM.

– chemical and pharmacologic phenomena

– biopharmaceutics
  – pharmacokinetics
  – area under curve
  – biological availability
  – biotransformation
  – metabolic clearance rate
  – metabolic detoxication, drug
  – metabolic detoxication, phase i
  – metabolic detoxication, phase ii
  – therapeutic equivalency
  – tissue distribution

– cytoprotection

– depression, chemical

– dose-response relationship, drug

– down-regulation

– drug design

– drug interactions
  – drug antagonism
  – drug synergism
  – food-drug interactions
  – herb-drug interactions

– drug resistance
  – drug resistance, microbial
  – drug resistance, bacterial
  – beta-lactam resistance
  – cephalosporin resistance
  – penicillin resistance
  – ampicillin resistance
  – methicillin resistance
  – chloramphenicol resistance
  – drug resistance, multiple, bacterial
  – kanamycin resistance
  – tetracycline resistance
  – trimethoprim resistance
  – vancomycin resistance
  – drug resistance, fungal
  – drug resistance, multiple, fungal
  – drug resistance, viral
  – drug resistance, multiple, viral
  – drug resistance, multiple
  – drug resistance, multiple, bacterial
  – drug resistance, multiple, fungal
  – drug resistance, multiple, viral
  – drug resistance, neoplasm
  – insecticide resistance
  – insulin resistance

– drug tolerance
  – tachyphylaxis

– inhibitory concentration 50

– kinetics

– lethal dose 50

– maximum tolerated dose

– no-observed-adverse-effect level

– stimulation, chemical

– structure-activity relationship
  – quantitative structure-activity relationship

– up-regulation

The list continues at List of MeSH codes (G13).

G12